Naeem Murr (born March 1965) is a British-born novelist and short story writer of Lebanese descent. He is the author of three novels acclaimed for their dark portraiture and stark, original prose. He currently lives in Chicago with his wife, poet Averill Curdy .

Biography

Born in London, Murr moved to the United States in his early twenties and has been a writer-in-residence at numerous universities, including Western Michigan University, the University of Missouri, and Northwestern University and was a Stanford University Creative Writing Fellow. His first novel, The Boy, concerns a father's search for a strange orphan he adopted into his family who has fled to live in a slum as a prostitute. It was a New York Times Notable Book. A second novel, The Genius of the Sea, explores the fears and failures of a social-worker coming to terms with his life by talking with a man who now occupies his dead mother's apartment. His most recent book The Perfect Man was published in 2007 to critical acclaim. The novel was awarded The Commonwealth Writers' Prize for the Best Book of Europe/South Asia, and was long-listed for the Man Booker Prize. Set in the 1950s, The Perfect Man details the life of an unwanted boy sent first from India to London, and then to small-town Missouri, and the complex web of relationships he develops as he matures.

Murr has received many awards for his writing, including a Lambda Literary Award, a Lannan Residency Fellowship, a Guggenheim Fellowship, a PEN Open Book Award and a Stegner Fellowship.

Bibliography
The Boy (1998)
The Genius of the Sea (2003)
The Perfect Man (2007) (UK publication in 2006)

External links
Official website

21st-century English novelists
Living people
University of Missouri faculty
British people of Lebanese descent
1965 births
Lambda Literary Award winners
English male novelists
21st-century English male writers